Ellen Bruno is an American documentary filmmaker. Her documentaries focus mostly on human rights issues, especially in Cambodia. Additionally, she has performed international relief work, in places such as Tibet, Cambodia, and Burma.

List of documentaries

References

External links

Year of birth missing (living people)
Living people
American documentary filmmakers